Constantine the Great is a 1683 tragedy by the English dramatist Nathaniel Lee. It is based on the reign of the Roman Emperor Constantine the Great. It was first staged by the United Company at the Theatre Royal, Drury Lane in London. The epilogue was written by John Dryden.

The original Drury Lane cast included William Smith as Constantine, Thomas Betterton as Crispus, Philip Griffin as Dalmatius, Cardell Goodman as Annibal, John Wiltshire as Lycinius, Thomas Gillow as Arius, Carey Perin as Labienus, Richard Saunders as Eubolus, John Bowman as Sylvester, Elizabeth Barry as  Fausta and Sarah Cooke as Serena.

References

Bibliography
 Van Lennep, W. The London Stage, 1660-1800: Volume One, 1660-1700. Southern Illinois University Press, 1960.

1683 plays
West End plays
Tragedy plays
Biographical plays
Plays by Nathaniel Lee
Plays set in ancient Rome
Plays set in the 3rd century